Niecki  is a village in the administrative district of Gmina Gostynin, within Gostynin County, Masovian Voivodeship, in east-central Poland.

The village has a population of 130.

References

Niecki